Tsarafidynia is a genus of moths in the subfamily Arctiinae. The genus was erected by Paul Griveaud in 1964. Both species are known from Madagascar.

Species
Tsarafidynia blanci Griveaud, 1974
Tsarafidynia perpusilla (Mabille, 1880)

References

Arctiinae